Ludkovice is a municipality and village in Zlín District in the Zlín Region of the Czech Republic. It has about 700 inhabitants.

Administrative parts
The village of Pradlisko is an administrative part of Ludkovice.

Etymology
The name of Ludkovice is derived from the personal name Luděk. The name of Pradlisko is derived from prát (i.e. "to wash") and referred to the place on the stream used to wash clothes.

Geography
It lies in the Vizovice Highlands. The Ludkovický Stream flows through the municipality. The Ludkovický Stream flows through the municipality. Ludkovice Reservoir is located on the stream.

History
The first written mention of Ludkovice is from 1412, when it belonged to the Světlov estate. Pradlovice was first mentioned in 1594.

Pradlisko was originally a part of Řetechov municipality and from 1976 a part of Luhačovice, after Řetechov merged with Luhačovice. Since 1980, it has been a part of Ludkovice.

Sights
The oldest monument is a calvary from 1692.

References

External links

Villages in Zlín District